Club Deportivo Lourdes is a Spanish football team based in Tudela, in the autonomous community of Navarre. Founded in 1978, it plays in Regional Preferente, holding home games at Campo de Fútbol Luis Asarta, with a capacity of 1,000 seats.

Season to season

10 seasons in Tercera División

Notable former players
 Francisco Jusué
 Mikel Arce

References

External links
Official website  
Futbolme.com profile  

Football clubs in Navarre
Association football clubs established in 1978
Divisiones Regionales de Fútbol clubs
1978 establishments in Spain